Piletocera stygialis is a moth in the family Crambidae. It was described by George Hampson in 1907. It is found on the Solomon Islands, where it has been recorded from Choiseul Island.

References

stygialis
Moths described in 1907
Taxa named by George Hampson
Moths of Oceania